On December 22, 2020, 47-year-old Andre Hill was shot and killed by Officer Adam Coy of the Columbus Division of Police in Columbus, Ohio. Coy had been called to the neighborhood in response to a non-emergency call from a neighbor who reportedly witnessed someone sit in an SUV and turn the car on and off. Hill was leaving a friend's house when Coy confronted and shot him. Hill was unarmed, and was holding a smartphone. Coy was fired from the Columbus Police less than a week later. 

The shooting was the second killing by police in Columbus in December 2020, following the shooting of Casey Goodson on December 4 by a Franklin County Sheriff's deputy.

People involved 
Andre Maurice Hill (also identified as Andre' Hill) was a 47-year-old African American man. He had one daughter and a granddaughter. Hill was a supporter of Black Lives Matter (BLM) and was wearing a BLM shirt when he was killed.

Adam Coy was a police officer in the Columbus Division of Police. Following the shooting, Coy was fired. Coy had been an officer with CPD for 19 years. During his career, 90 citizen complaints had been filed against Coy, and his police personnel file reflected a number of incidents, going back at least nine years, in which Coy had reacted inappropriately while under stress. He had received "documented constructive counseling" for discourtesy toward citizens (such as swearing), irresponsible driving, smoking while on duty, and failure to use police-car microphones.  

In October 2012, the division, after an internal investigation and hearing, found that Coy had used excessive force after he slammed a suspected drunk driver's head four times against the hood of a police car, an incident captured on dashboard camera. While the police chief and city public safety director recommended  that Coy receive a 200-hour suspension, a grievance filed by the local Fraternal Order of Police resulted in the suspension being reduced to 160 hours. The incident also resulted in the City of Columbus paying $54,000 in a settlement.

Incident 
Coy and another officer, who has been identified as Amy Detweiler, responded to a non-emergency call around 1:49 AM about a car repeatedly turning on and off near 1000 Oberlin Drive. It is unclear if this car had anything to do with Hill. Around the same time Coy and Detweiler arrived at the scene, Hill was leaving a friend's house while holding an illuminated smartphone in his left hand. Bodycam footage shows Coy and Hill walking toward each other. Coy shot Hill several times, as he yelled at him to show his hands. 

Hill was shot three times in the right leg and once in the chest. Coy did not turn on his body-worn camera before the shooting, but the camera has a 60-second look-back feature that recorded the minute prior, including the shooting, with video but not audio. Hill was taken to OhioHealth Riverside Methodist Hospital where he was pronounced dead.

After Hill was shot, several officers handcuffed him while he lay unresponsive on the ground. Video recordings from Coy and others show that none of the multiple officers on the scene made an attempt to render first aid to Hill until ten minutes after he was shot.

Investigation and termination 
The Franklin County's coroner office determined that the manner of death was homicide and the cause of death was multiple gunshot wounds. The Ohio Bureau of Criminal Investigation investigated the shooting. On December 28, Coy was fired from the Columbus Division of Police, on the recommendations of Mayor Andrew Ginther and Police Chief Tom Quinlan.

Criminal charges
On February 3, 2021, a Franklin County grand jury indicted Coy on charges of murder (one count), felonious assault (one count) and dereliction of duty (two counts). The latter two charges are based on Coy's failure to activate his body camera and failing to alert Officer Detweiller that he believed Hill posed a threat. At the request of the Franklin County Prosecutor, the Ohio Attorney General and his designees were appointed a special prosecutor to prosecute the case in lieu of local prosecutors. On April 23, prosecutors filed an additional charge of reckless murder against Coy.

Coy pleaded not guilty; the court set bond at $3 million. His trial was initially scheduled for March 7, 2022, but was postponed until November to allow Coy to recover from a recent hip replacement surgery. The trial was delayed a second time on November 1 to allow the defence more time to prepare a rebuttal for the prosecution's expert witnesses.

Settlement
In May 2021, Columbus city officials agreed to pay a settlement of $10 million, to Mr. Hill's family. If approved by the City Council, this will be the largest settlement ever paid out by the city. According to attorneys, it is also the "largest pretrial settlement in a police use-of-force case in state history".

Vigils and demonstrations
A protest occurred on December 24 in the neighborhood where the shooting occurred. Demonstrators also protested the death of Casey Goodson, who was killed by police on December 4. Goodson was not killed by a Columbus Division of Police officer, but rather by a Franklin County Sheriff's deputy.

Hill's family hired civil rights attorney Benjamin Crump. Crump spoke at a vigil for Hill, as did Hill's daughter. 
On December 26, a vigil for Hill was held at the Brentnell Community Center in North East Columbus. During the vigil, Benjamin Crump announced that an independent autopsy would be conducted on Hill. On December 28, a vigil was held at a church in Northwest Columbus.

"Andre's Law"
In February 2021, the Columbus City Council unanimously approved a new city ordinance ("Andre's Law"), requiring city police to turn on cameras during "enforcement actions" (including "all police stops, pursuits, uses of force, arrests, forced entries and any adversarial encounters") whenever they approach people or exit patrol cars. The ordinance also requires officers who use force that causes injuries to render first aid and call emergency medical personnel, unless there is an imminent threat to officers. The law also requires officers to receive CPR and basic first aid training on an ongoing basis. The ordinance provides that failure to turn on a camera or render first aid could result in departmental discipline or—if done with "reckless disregard"—criminal charges for dereliction of duty.

In July 2021, State Representative Dontavius Jarrells introduced House Bill 367 to make the Law statewide.

See also
 2020–2022 United States racial unrest
 George Floyd protests in Columbus, Ohio
 Killing of Donovan Lewis
 List of killings by law enforcement officers in the United States, December 2020

References 

2020 controversies in the United States
2020 in Ohio
2020–2021 United States racial unrest
21st century in Columbus, Ohio
African-American-related controversies
Black Lives Matter
Deaths by firearm in Ohio
Deaths by person in Ohio
Filmed killings by law enforcement
Law enforcement controversies in the United States
December 2020 events in the United States
African Americans shot dead by law enforcement officers in the United States